Jerry Winsett (born July 19, 1950) is an actor, writer and singer who has appeared in numerous television shows including Coach, Mr. Belvedere, It’s Garry Shandling's Show and Newhart as well as such films as The Chosen, One Crazy Summer, Ragtime and Woody Allen's Radio Days. He starred in the nightclub act Schoch and Jerry in New York City with Tim Schoch, which was rated "Tops in Town" by Show Business magazine.

His many theatre appearances include Toby Belch in Twelfth Night at Nevada Shakespeare in the Park, Epicure Mammon in Mark Ringer's production of The Alchemist at the Globe Playhouse, Nick Bottom in A Midsummer Night's Dream at the Tennessee Shakespeare Festival, Benjamin Franklin in 1776 and Sancho Panza in Man of La Mancha with Lane Davies as Don Quixote, the premiere production at the multimillion-dollar Thousand Oaks Civic Arts Plaza.

Winsett's writing credits include the plays Who Killed Mayor Stratton? and its sequel, Who Murdered the Mayor?, Gold's Fever, the musical Pssst! Tell 'Em Joe Sent Ya!, and an adaptation of Dracula in which he appeared as Renfield.

External links
 

1950 births
20th-century American dramatists and playwrights
American male stage actors
Living people